Antonio Pinto may refer to:

 António Pinto (runner) (born 1966), Portuguese long-distance runner 
 Antônio Pinto (composer) (born 1967), Brazilian composer of film music
 António Costa Pinto (born 1953), Portuguese professor of politics and history
 Antonio Augusto Ferreira Pinto Júnior (born 1986), Brazilian defensive midfielder
 António Marinho e Pinto (born 1950), Portuguese lawyer and former journalist

See also
Antonio Vico y Pintos (1840–1940), Spanish stage actor
Pinto, a list of people whose given name or surname is Pinto
Pinto (disambiguation)